Rakoff is a surname. Notable people with the surname include:

Alvin Rakoff (born 1927), Canadian television, stage and film director
David Rakoff (1964–2012), Canadian-born American writer
Jed S. Rakoff (born 1943), American judge
Joanna Rakoff (born 1972), American journalist, poet, critic and novelist
Simon Rakoff (born 1960), Canadian comedian